Apalachee was a Muskogean language of Florida. It was closely related to Koasati and Alabama.

The language is known primarily from one document, a letter written in 1688 to Charles II of Spain.  Geoffrey Kimball has produced a grammatical sketch and a vocabulary of the language based on the contents of the letter.

Apalachee was found to belong to the same branch of the Muskogean family as Koasati, Alabama, and Hitchiti.

Phonology

Consonants

Orthography is only shown where it differs from the IPA.

Vowels

Vowels may also be elongated.

References

External links 
Apalachee Language Guide

Apalachee
Muskogean languages
Languages extinct in the 18th century
18th-century disestablishments in North America
Extinct languages of North America